is a Japanese professional baseball 2nd baseman for the Yomiuri Giants in Japan's Nippon Professional Baseball.

On November 16, 2018, he was selected Yomiuri Giants roster at the 2018 MLB Japan All-Star Series exhibition game against MLB All-Stars.

On February 27, 2019, he was selected first time for Japan national baseball team at the 2019 exhibition games against Mexico.

References

External links

NPB.com

1995 births
Living people
Japanese baseball players
Nippon Professional Baseball second basemen
Baseball people from Gifu Prefecture
Yomiuri Giants players
Chukyo Gakuin University alumni